Dorothy Evelyn Miell  is a professor of Social Psychology, and since March 2010 has been Head of the College of Arts, Humanities and Social Sciences, and Vice-Principal, at the University of Edinburgh. Before moving to Edinburgh, she was Dean of Social Sciences at the Open University. Her research focuses on collaboration and communication patterns, recently in the context of creative endeavours.

Miell is a Fellow of the Royal Society of Edinburgh and a Fellow of the British Psychological Society. She was President of the British Psychological Society from 2014 to 2015. She is Vice-Chair of the Board of Directors on Scottish Opera and a member of the Council of the Edinburgh International Festival. She is a Governor of the Royal Conservatoire of Scotland

Under her leadership the University of Edinburgh is transforming the old Edinburgh Royal Infirmary site into Edinburgh Futures Institute, a research and teaching institute designed to tackle the big challenges of the future. She was appointed Officer of the Order of the British Empire (OBE) in the 2019 Birthday Honours for services to higher education and psychology.

Selected bibliography

Books

References

External links 
 Profile page: Dorothy Miell, University of Edinburgh

Year of birth missing (living people)
Living people
Social psychologists
British psychologists
Fellows of the British Psychological Society
Fellows of the Royal Society of Edinburgh
Academics of the University of Edinburgh
Place of birth missing (living people)
Officers of the Order of the British Empire
Alumni of Lancaster University
People educated at Bradford Girls' Grammar School
Women academics